Yelena Petrova (born 13 October 1966) is a Russian former judoka who won a bronze medal in the 1992 Summer Olympics. Petrova won bronze as well at the 1994 Goodwill Games After ending her career in 2000 she became a judo coach.

References

1966 births
Living people
Russian female judoka
Olympic judoka of the Unified Team
Judoka at the 1992 Summer Olympics
Olympic bronze medalists for the Unified Team
Olympic medalists in judo
Judoka trainers
Medalists at the 1992 Summer Olympics
Competitors at the 1994 Goodwill Games
20th-century Russian women
21st-century Russian women